Alfred Motta (20 December 1882 – 23 March 1932) was a Jamaican cricketer. He played in eight first-class matches for the Jamaican cricket team from 1904 to 1909.

See also
 List of Jamaican representative cricketers

References

External links
 

1882 births
1932 deaths
Jamaican cricketers
Jamaica cricketers
Sportspeople from Kingston, Jamaica